The following radio stations broadcast on FM frequency 98.3 MHz:

Argentina
 Radio La Red (Rosario) in Rosario, Santa Fe
 Radio María in San Carlos Minas, Córdoba
 Radio María in Merlo, San Luis

Australia
 1XXR in Canberra, Australian Capital Territory
 Now FM in Moree, New South Wales
 Radio National in Port Stephens, New South Wales

Canada (Channel 252)
 CBAL-FM in Moncton, New Brunswick
 CBRM-FM in Medicine Hat, Alberta
 CBRU-FM in Squamish, British Columbia
 CBW-FM in Winnipeg, Manitoba
 CFLY-FM in Kingston, Ontario
 CFPX-FM in Pukatawagan, Manitoba
 CFWP-FM in Wahta First Nation, Ontario
 CHER-FM in Sydney, Nova Scotia
 CHNC-FM-2 in Chandler, Quebec
 CHQX-FM-2 in La Ronge, Saskatchewan
 CHUN-FM in Rouyn-Noranda, Quebec
 CIAX-FM in Windsor, Quebec
 CIEL-FM-3 in Cabano, Quebec
 CIFM-FM in Kamloops, British Columbia
 CIWV-FM in Vancouver, British Columbia
 CJMK-FM in Saskatoon, Saskatchewan
 CJSJ-FM in Campement Sarcelle, Quebec
 CKRS-FM in Chicoutimi, Quebec
 CKSR-FM in Chilliwack, British Columbia
 CKUA-FM-10 in Athabasca, Alberta
 VF2321 in Kuujjuaq, Quebec
 VF2375 in New Denver, British Columbia
 VF2509 in Fort Vermilion, Alberta
 VOAR-8-FM in Grand Falls, Newfoundland and Labrador

China 
 CNR The Voice of China in Jiaxing
 CNR Business Radio in Quanzhou and Putian

Germany
 Radio Bielefeld

India
 Radio Mirchi

Ireland
 Cork Campus Radio in Cork city

Malaysia
 8FM in Kuching, Sarawak
 Radio Klasik in Selangor and Western Pahang
 Mix in Kuala Terengganu, Terengganu

Mexico
XHBAJA-FM in San Quintín, Baja California
 XHBF-FM in San Pedro de las Colonias, Coahuila
 XHDT-FM in Ciudad Cuauhtémoc, Chihuahua
 XHEML-FM in Apatzingán, Michoacán
 XHFP-FM in Jalpa, Zacatecas
 XHLG-FM in León, Guanajuato
 XHLI-FM in Villahermosa, Tabasco
 XHMIX-FM in La Rumorosa, Baja California
 XHMTLA-FM in Tlatlaya, State of Mexico
 XHMVM-FM in Maravatío, Michoacán
 XHPAB-FM in La Paz, Baja California Sur
 XHPVBB-FM in Puerto Vallarta, Jalisco
 XHPX-FM in Ciudad Juarez, Chihuahua
 XHRAF-FM in Rafael Delgado, Veracruz
 XHVHC-FM in Mapastepec, Chiapas

Nigeria
Hot 98.3 in Abuja

Philippines
 DWID in Dagupan City
 DZLQ in Lucena City
 DWRV in Naga City
 DZIM in Masbate
 DYEZ-FM in Puerto Princesa City
 DYNJ in Iloilo City
 DXUA in Pagadian City
 DXQS in General Santos City

Taiwan
 Kiss Radio Taiwan in Miaoli

United Kingdom
 BBC Radio 1 in Aberdeen, Abergavenny, Argyll & Bute, Borders, Ceredigion, Folkestone, Kirkcudbright, Lincolnshire, Londonderry, Luddenden, Okehampton, South Newry, Stirling

United States (Channel 252)
 KACE in Beatty, Nevada
 KADQ-FM in Evanston, Wyoming
  in Price, Utah
 KATR-FM in Otis, Colorado
 KBAS-LP in Basin, Montana
  in Dillon, Montana
  in Bridgeport, Texas
 KCDM-LP in Burlington, Iowa
 KCRD-LP in Dubuque, Iowa
  in Oxnard, California
 KDGZ-LP in Townsend, Montana
 KDLA in New Llano, Louisiana
 KDME-LP in Fort Madison, Iowa
 KDVC in Columbia, Missouri
  in Mccall, Idaho
 KEDI in Bethel, Alaska
  in Gunnison, Colorado
  in Torrington, Wyoming
 KEYW in Pasco, Washington
  in Cherokee Village, Arkansas
 KFFD-LP in Beaverton, Oregon
 KFWG-LP in Clinton, Oklahoma
 KFXM-LP in Lancaster, California
 KGRK in Glenrock, Wyoming
 KHPJ-LP in Hastings, Nebraska
  in Farwell, Texas
 KJLC-LP in Crystal City, Texas
  in Pukalani, Hawaii
  in Bentonville, Arkansas
 KKFR in Mayer, Arizona
 KKVI-LP in Greenville, Texas
  in Harbeck-Fruitdale, Oregon
 KMWV in Dallas, Oregon
  in Marana, Arizona
  in Bryan, Texas
  in Rainier, Oregon
  in Pecos, Texas
  in Spring Grove, Minnesota
 KQZQ in Kiowa, Kansas
  in West Covina, California
 KSMK-LP in Saint Marys, Kansas
  in Twin Falls, Idaho
 KTUP in Dallas, Oregon
  in Bend, Oregon
 KULM-FM in Columbus, Texas
  in Wessington Springs, South Dakota
  in Turlock, California
  in Boone, Iowa
  in Lakeport, California
 KXDJ in Spearman, Texas
 KXGT in Carrington, North Dakota
 KXIM in Sanborn, Iowa
 KYAR in Gatesville, Texas
 KYYK in Palestine, Texas
 KZLA in Riverdale, California
  in West Monroe, Louisiana
  in Story, Wyoming
 WBFA in Fort Mitchell, Alabama
 WBJI in Blackduck, Minnesota
 WBYB in Cleveland, Mississippi
  in Crest Hill, Illinois
 WCEF in Ripley, West Virginia
 WCEH-FM in Pinehurst, Georgia
 WCLP-LP in Lake Placid, New York
  in Sault Sainte Marie, Michigan
  in Park Falls, Wisconsin
  in Hartford, Michigan
 WDAQ in Danbury, Connecticut
  in Murfreesboro, North Carolina
 WEHB-LP in Wadesboro, North Carolina
 WGCO in Midway, Georgia
 WGWD-LP in Paintsville, Kentucky
 WHAI in Greenfield, Massachusetts
  in Whitley City, Kentucky
  in Clearwater, South Carolina
 WHRF in Belle Haven, Virginia
 WIDI in Quebradillas, Puerto Rico
  in Willimantic, Connecticut
  in Thomasville, North Carolina
  in Prentiss, Mississippi
 WJGG-LP in Thomasville, Georgia
 WJLI in Metropolis, Illinois
  in Menomonee Falls, Wisconsin
 WJQJ-LP in Gatlinburg, Tennessee
  in Scottsboro, Alabama
  in Kettering, Ohio
 WKJY in Hempstead, New York
  in Logan, Ohio
 WKSG in Garrison, Kentucky
  in Stephens City, Virginia
  in North Muskegon, Michigan
  in Summerton, South Carolina
  in Laconia, New Hampshire
  in Clarksville, Virginia
 WLVM in Chickasaw, Alabama
 WLXA in Loretto, Tennessee
  in Fredericktown, Ohio
  in New Brunswick, New Jersey
 WMIM in Luna Pier, Michigan
 WMTY-FM in Sweetwater, Tennessee
  in Frederiksted, Virgin Islands
 WPBE-LP in West Palm Beach, Florida
 WPBV-LP in Palm Beach, Florida
 WPEO-FM in Farmer City, Illinois
  in Bellefontaine, Ohio
 WPKV in Duquesne, Pennsylvania
 WQEG-LP in Chicago, Illinois
  in Salamanca, New York
  in Elizabethtown, Kentucky
 WRBG in Mifflinburg, Pennsylvania
 WRLR-LP in Round Lake Heights, Illinois
 WRTO-FM in Goulds, Florida
  in Munising, Michigan
 WSGN in Stewartville, Alabama
  in Mechanicsville, Maryland
  in Monticello, New York
 WSVZ in Tower Hill, Illinois
  in Petersburg, New Jersey
  in Rotterdam, New York
 WUIN (FM) in Oak Island, North Carolina
  in Bath, New York
  in Fort Meade, Florida
  in Ashtabula, Ohio
 WYMR in Culver, Indiana
 WYZK-LP in Hartselle, Alabama
 WZNY-LP in Fairport, New York
 WZRL in Plainfield, Indiana
  in Winchester, Indiana

References

Lists of radio stations by frequency